Bent Christensen (28 May 1929 – 6 January 1992) was a Danish film director, actor, film producer and screenwriter. His film Harry and the Butler (1961) was named Best Film at the Bodil Awards and was nominated for the Academy Award for Best Foreign Language Film. His 1966 film Neighbours was entered into the 5th Moscow International Film Festival.

Selected filmography
 We Who Go the Kitchen Route (1953)
 Der kom en dag (1955)
 The Last Winter (1960)
 Harry and the Butler (1961)
 Neighbours (1966)

References

External links

1929 births
1992 deaths
Danish film directors
Danish male film actors
Danish film producers
Danish male screenwriters
20th-century Danish male actors
20th-century screenwriters